The Glenkens (Scottish Gaelic: An Gleann Cain) is located midway along the western section of the Southern Upland way in the historic county of Kirkcudbrightshire in Galloway, Scotland. The Glenkens is made up of the parishes of Carsphairn, Dalry, Kells, Parton and Balmaclellan. The name comes from the River Ken which runs through the valley before flowing into the River Dee and then down to the sea.

References 

Geography of Dumfries and Galloway
Dumfries and Galloway articles missing geocoordinate data